Lieutenant General Donald C. Wurster is a retired Commander, Air Force Special Operations Command, Hurlburt Field, FL. The command is a major command of the U.S. Air Force and the Air Force component of U.S. Special Operations Command. AFSOC provides Air Force Special Operations Forces for worldwide deployment and assignment to unified combatant commanders. The command has approximately 12,900 active-duty, Reserve, Air National Guard and civilian professionals.

Life
Born in Washington, DC, Wurster was commissioned in 1973 upon graduation from the United States Air Force Academy. In 1974, he completed undergraduate helicopter training at Fort Rucker, Alabama.  He commanded special operations forces at the squadron, group, wing and subunified command level, and he served as commander of all U.S. forces assigned to Joint Task Force-510 during Operation Enduring Freedom - Philippines. Wurster was Deputy Director, Center for Special Operations, USSOCOM from May 2004 to February 2006.

General Wurster is a command pilot with more than 4,000 flying hours, including assignments in both rescue and special operations.

His Brother Charles D. Wurster retired in 2008 as a Vice Admiral in the US Coast Guard. The Wurster family has a record of military service dating back to the Revolutionary War. As three-star flag officers, the brothers hold the highest rank of anyone in their family. Their father, retired USAF Colonel Charles Wurster, was a F-51 and F-80 (P-80) pilot with the 36th Fighter Squadron in the Korean War and became one of only three pilots to score more than one “kill” in all of 1950.

Education
1973 Bachelor of Science degree, U.S. Air Force Academy, Colorado Springs, Colo.
1982 Distinguished graduate, Squadron Officer School, Maxwell AFB, Ala.
1983 Master of Arts degree, Webster University, St. Louis, Mo.
1987 Distinguished graduate, Air Command and Staff College, Maxwell AFB, Ala.
1994 Air War College, by correspondence
1997 Industrial College of the Armed Forces, Fort Lesley J. McNair, Washington, D.C.
2004 National Security Leadership Course, Syracuse New York
2009 Leadership at the Peak, Center for Creative Leadership, Colorado Springs, Colorado

Assignments
June 1973 - July 1974, student, undergraduate helicopter training, Fort Rucker, Ala.
July 1974 - March 1975, student, HH-3E Jolly Green Giant training, Hill AFB, Utah
March 1975 - May 1976, HH-3E pilot, Detachment 13, 41st Rescue and Weather Reconnaissance Wing, Osan Air Base, South Korea
May 1976 - July 1979, HH-3E instructor pilot, 71st Air Rescue and Recovery Squadron, Elmendorf AFB, Alaska
July 1979 - November 1980, inactive Air Force Reserve, Lowry AFB, Colo.
November 1980 - December 1983, HH-3E evaluator pilot, 1550th Aircrew Training and Test Wing, Kirtland AFB, N.M.
December 1983 - July 1986, weapon systems program manager for rescue and special operations forces, Aircraft Acquisition Branch, Headquarters Military Airlift Command, Scott AFB, Ill.
July 1986 - June 1987, student, Air Command and Staff College, Maxwell AFB, Ala.
June 1987 - July 1989, MH-60G Pave Hawk assistant operations officer, 55th Special Operations Squadron, Eglin AFB, Fla.
July 1989 - August 1991, program element monitor for rescue and special operations forces, Office of the Secretary of the Air Force for Acquisition, Headquarters U.S. Air Force, Washington, D.C.
August 1991 - July 1994, operations officer, then MH-53J Pave Low IIIE commander, 21st Special Operations Squadron, Royal Air Force Woodbridge and Royal Air Force Alconbury, England
July 1994 - July 1996, assistant for electronics, communications and special programs, Office of the Assistant Secretary of Defense for Special Operations and Low-Intensity Conflict, Forces and Resources, Washington, D.C.
July 1996 - July 1997, student, Industrial College of the Armed Forces, Fort Lesley J. McNair, Washington, D.C.
July 1997 - September 1997, MH-53J requalification, 551st Flying Training Squadron, Kirtland AFB, N.M.
September 1997 - June 1998, Commander, 16th Operations Group, Hurlburt Field, Fla.
June 1998 - July 1999, Commander, 16th Special Operations Wing, Hurlburt Field, Fla.
October 1999 - October 2000, Inspector General, U.S. Transportation Command and Headquarters Air Mobility Command, Scott AFB, Ill.
October 2000 - February 2003, Commander, Special Operations Command, Pacific, Camp H.M. Smith, Hawaii
February 2003 - May 2004, special assistant to the Commander, U.S. Special Operations Command, later, Director, Center for Intelligence and Information Operations, USSOCOM, MacDill AFB, Fla.
May 2004 - February 2006, Deputy Director, Center for Special Operations, USSOCOM, MacDill AFB, Fla.
February 2006 - November 2007, Vice Commander, Air Force Special Operations Command, Hurlburt Field, Fla.
November 2007 – June 2011, Commander, Air Force Special Operations Command, Hurlburt Field, Fla.

Flight Information
Rating: Command pilot
Flight hours: More than 4,000
Aircraft flown: AC-130, HH-3E, MC-130, MH-53J, MH-60G, and CV-22 Osprey, PZL M28 & U-28

Awards and decorations

Effective Dates Of Promotion
Second Lieutenant June 6, 1973
First Lieutenant June 6, 1975
Captain June 6, 1977
Major February 1, 1986
Lieutenant Colonel April 1, 1989
Colonel June 1, 1996
Brigadier General September 1, 2000
Major General October 1, 2004
Lieutenant General November 27, 2007

Retirement
Lt. Gen. Wurster retired from the U.S. Air Force on Friday 24 June 2011, handing over command of AFSOC to Lt. Gen. Eric E. Fiel in a ceremony held at Hurlburt Field. His official retirement date was August 1, 2011.

“Lt. Gen. Wurster has been a brilliant and strong leader,” said Adm. Eric Olson, commander of the U.S. Special Operations Command. “He led by always putting people first in the air and on the ground. Today is more than a transfer of authority. We say goodbye to a great leader and friend.

“Gen. Fiel will now bring his own vision,” Olson added. “There will be challenges, but I've seen him face challenges before and overcome many obstacles. In the transition from one commander to another, I know (AFSOC) will continue to excel.”

Air Force Chief of Staff Gen. Norton Schwartz presided over the ceremony. “This is a great time to be amongst the Special Operations Squadron,” Schwartz said. “Gen. Wurster will now get to enjoy fishing, hunting and life after command service. This is a new and tremendous chapter for you."

References

Year of birth missing (living people)
Living people
United States Air Force generals
United States Air Force Academy alumni
Webster University alumni
Dwight D. Eisenhower School for National Security and Resource Strategy alumni
Recipients of the Legion of Merit
Recipients of the Air Medal
Recipients of the Defense Superior Service Medal
Recipients of the Philippine Legion of Honor